Mala'e may refer to:

Mala'e (Futuna)
Mala'e (Wallis)